Marayikkodu Sree Indilayappan Kshethram (മലയാളം:ഇണ്ടിളയപ്പൻ ക്ഷേത്രം, മാരായിക്കോട്)  is a powerful 1500-year-old Hindu temple in South India. Non-Hindus are permitted in the temple. It is in Karickom, 5 km from Kottarakara.

Temple
Shiva (Shiva Lingam), Devi Parvathy and Vishnu are the main deities of this temple. The sub-deities of the temple are Lord Ganesh, Nagarajavu & Nagayakshi, Brahmarakshas and Yakshi.

Here devotees are considering the temple as two. One is Lord Shiva Temple and the other is Lord Vishnu Temple. The Lord Shiva temple has two separate sanctum sanctorums, one devoted to Lord Shiva (Shivalingam), looking to the east, and the other for Devi Parvathy looking to the west. The Lord Vishnu temple has one sanctum sanctorum for Lord Vishnu, looking to the east.

The Lord Ganesha shrine has one separate sanctum sanctorum. As per vastu, the sanctum sanctorum is located on the "Kanni mula" (south-west corner) of Lord Shiva temple. Sri Nagaraj & Nagayakshi and Brahmarakshas are worshipping devotees on the "Kanni mula" of Lord Ganesha. Yakshi have the place beneath the Strychine tree (Kanjirum) near the Lord Vishnu's sanctum sanctorum.

References

Ganesha temples
Hindu temples in Kollam district